Joe Menosky is a television writer known for his work on the various Star Trek series.

Career
He graduated from Pomona College in 1979, where the number 47 holds special importance (see 47 as an in-joke).
Menosky is the writer credited with starting the trend of trying to work the number 47 into many scripts.

Menosky joined the writing staff for Season 4 of Star Trek: The Next Generation, and also wrote for several episodes for Star Trek: Deep Space Nine and Star Trek: Voyager. As a writer on Voyager, he usually co-wrote with Brannon Braga. In June 2016, it was announced that Menosky had joined the writing staff for Star Trek: Discovery.

He later began work as a co-producer on The Orville, and wrote the second-season episode "Sanctuary".

Writing credits

Hunter 
“The Jade Woman,” Air date: October 17, 1987
“Hot Prowl,” (Teleplay; Story by Joseph Gunn), Air date: December 8, 1987
“Allegra,” Air date: December 29, 1987
“Presumed Guilty,” Air date: November 26, 1988
“The Pit,” Air date: January 14, 1989
“City Under Siege, Part 1,” (Teleplay; Story by George Geiger & Tom Chehak), Air date: February 4, 1989
“Return of White Cloud,” (co-writer with Erin Conroy and Stepfanie Kramer ), Air date: May 21, 1989

Star Trek: The Next Generation
 "Legacy"
 "First Contact" with Marc Scott Zicree, Dennis Russell Bailey, David Bischoff, Ronald D. Moore and Michael Piller
 "The Nth Degree"
 "In Theory" with Ronald D. Moore
 "Clues" with Bruce D. Arthurs
 "Darmok" with Philip Lazebnik
 "Hero Worship" with Hilary J. Bader
 "Time's Arrow", Parts I and II with Michael Piller
 "The Chase" with Ronald D. Moore
 "Suspicions" with Naren Shankar
 "Masks"
 "Emergence" with Brannon Braga

Star Trek: Deep Space Nine
 "Dramatis Personae"
 "Rivals" with Jim Trombetta and Michael Piller
 "Distant Voices" with Ira Steven Behr and Robert Hewitt Wolfe

Star Trek: Voyager
 "Cathexis" with Brannon Braga
 "The Thaw" with Richard Gadas
 "Remember" with Brannon Braga
 "Future's End" Parts 1–2 with Brannon Braga
 "Alter Ego"  
 "Distant Origin" with Brannon Braga
 "Scorpion" Parts 1–2 with Brannon Braga
 "The Gift"
 "Year of Hell" Parts 1–2 with Brannon Braga
 "The Killing Game" Parts 1–2 with Brannon Braga
 "Living Witness" with Bryan Fuller & Brannon Braga
 "Hope and Fear" with Rick Berman & Brannon Braga
 "Timeless" with Rick Berman & Brannon Braga
 "Equinox" Parts 1–2 with Rick Berman & Brannon Braga
 "Tinker, Tenor, Doctor, Spy" with Bill Vallely
 "The Voyager Conspiracy"
 "Blink of an Eye" with Michael Taylor
 "Muse"

Star Trek: Discovery
 "Lethe" with Ted Sullivan

For All Mankind 
 "The Weight"
 "Best-Laid Plans"	
 "Happy Valley"

References

 Denise & Michael Okuda, Star Trek Chronology: A History of the Future, Appendix J, "Writing Credits".

External links
 

Living people
Year of birth missing (living people)
Pomona College alumni
American television writers
Screenwriters from California